Lesley University is a private university in Cambridge, Massachusetts. It is accredited by the New England Commission of Higher Education. As of 2018-19 Lesley University enrolled 6,593 students (2,707 undergraduate and 3,886 graduate).

History

1909–1998: Lesley School/College and the School of Practical Art/Art Institute of Boston

The Lesley School (also known as Lesley Normal School) was founded by Edith Lesley in 1909 at her home at 29 Everett Street, Cambridge. The school began as a private women's institution that trained kindergarten teachers. As such, it espoused the work of Friedrich Froebel, who invented the concept of kindergarten as a complement to the care given to children by their mothers. Teacher and writer Elizabeth Peabody opened Boston's first Froebel-inspired kindergarten in 1860; more kindergartens followed. Central to the Froeblian philosophy is the idea that individuals are important and unique, a focus that remains today at Lesley University.

Edith Lesley, after having lived in Panama and Maine and studied in Freiburg, Germany, moved to Boston and became involved with public school teaching. She completed kindergarten training, took courses at Radcliffe College, and then began to plan her own kindergarten training school. She wanted a school that would "consider the individual of basic importance; to inculcate the idea of gracious living; and to foster the tradition of American democracy." [quote from "A Century of Innovation," Brown and Forinash, eds.] Now married, Lesley and her husband expanded the school by constructing an addition at the rear of their home, which today is known as Livingston Stebbins Hall.

Around 1913, the Lesley School began training for elementary teachers. In 1941, the Lesley School reorganized under a board of trustees; in 1944, it received authority to award baccalaureate degrees and became known as Lesley College. In 1954, the college began to award graduate degrees; it later added majors in the fields of education, counseling, human services, global studies, art therapy, and management.

The School of Practical Art was founded by Roy Davidson in 1912. The school's early philosophy was based upon John Ruskin's words that it is "in art that the heart, the head, and the hand of a man come together" and Davidson's own belief that "beauty comes from the use." The school increasingly embraced the fine arts and developed a growing liberal arts curriculum; in 1967 the school was renamed the Art Institute of Boston to acknowledge its increased focus upon fine art as well as design, illustration, and photography.

1998–2009: Lesley becomes coeducational, builds new dormitories
In 1998, the Art Institute of Boston and Lesley College merged, and became Lesley University in 2001.

When university status was gained, the original colleges became the undergraduate units of the university. Lesley College's two graduate schools rounded out the university's four main academic units. In 2005, Lesley College (at that point, an all-female liberal arts college) became coeducational.

In 2006, the university acquired Prospect Hall, a former church listed on the National Register of Historic Places, with the goal of bringing the Art Institute of Boston to Cambridge.

In 2007, Joseph B. Moore became president of Lesley. The following year, the university entered into a partnership with Episcopal Divinity School to jointly operate their Brattle Street campus and purchase several buildings. This move added dormitories, a dining hall, and classrooms, as well as an expansion in library services and administrative space.

In 2009, the university celebrated its Centennial and embarked on its first major construction since the 1970s. Dormitories at 1 and 3 Wendell street were added to the residential life offerings. Both buildings are LEED Gold–certified.

2010–present: Lesley opens Lunder Arts Center, expands Cambridge footprint 
In 2013, construction on the Lunder Arts Center began in Porter Square. The project was built on the former site of the North Prospect Church, which was moved slightly to the south and repurposed.  Also In 2013, Lesley University's constituent colleges, the Art Institute of Boston and Lesley College, were renamed College of Art and Design and College of Liberal Arts and Sciences, respectively; the change is reflective of the cohesion and growth of the two colleges.

In 2015, the College of Art and Design officially left Kenmore Square in Boston and joined the remainder of the university in Cambridge. This move marked the completion of the Lunder Arts Center as well as the first time in 17 years that the university was entirely housed in Cambridge. The Lunder Arts Center was awarded a LEED Gold certification from the U.S. Green Building Council. Lesley also won a prestigious Preservation Award from the Cambridge Historical Commission for the restoration of the historic former North Prospect Church as part o the Lunder Arts Center project.

At the end of the 2014–15 academic year, President Joseph B. Moore announced that he would retired the following year. In 2016, Jeff A. Weiss became president and resigned in 2018 due to personal health reasons. In 2018, Richard S. Hansen became interim president.

In July 2018, Lesley announced the purchase of the historic buildings formerly owned by the Episcopal Divinity School (EDS), making Lesley the sole owner of the 4.4-acre Brattle Campus. The purchase included five buildings - St. John's Memorial Chapel, Wright Hall, Burnham Hall, Reed Hall and 4 Berkeley St. - and the remainder of Sherrill Hall. Since 2008, Lesley and EDS had jointly owned Sherrill Hall as part of the schools’ condominium agreement.

Academics

The university, with its component undergraduate colleges, graduate schools, and centers, offers more than 20 undergraduate majors and over 90 Adult Bachelor's, Master's, Certificates of Advanced Graduate Study, and PhD programs at its Cambridge and Boston campuses, as well as off-campus and online. The Lesley Center for the Adult Learner offers an adult bachelor's degree program, including on- and off-campus courses as well as online and hybrid courses targeted toward adult learners.

The university is made up of the following academic units:
 College of Art and Design
 College of Liberal Arts and Sciences
 Center for the Adult Learner
 Graduate School of Education
Center for Reading Recovery & Literacy Collaborative
 Graduate School of Arts and Social Sciences
 Threshold Program

The university library system is made up of the following units:
Henry Knox Sherrill Library – Main collections
 Teaching Resources Collection
 Evelyn M. Finnegan '48 Collection for Children's Literature
 University Archives
 John and Carol Moriarty Library – Lunder Arts Center
 Art and Design Collection

Campuses

South Campus
The South Campus is in Harvard Square. It is home to four residence halls, a dining hall, classrooms, the Sherrill Hall, and the Graduate School of Arts and Social Sciences—that building is also the birthplace of Charles Sanders Peirce.

Doble Campus
The Doble Campus is adjacent to Cambridge Common. It is home to residence halls and a dining hall, classrooms, and the College of Liberal Arts and Sciences, as well as Marran Theater and a variety of administrative offices. It is also home to many student life facilities, such as the Margaret McKenna Student Center, the Information Commons (a 24-hour computer lab and study space), and the fitness center. The campus is named for Lesley benefactor and former chair of the Lesley Corporation, Frank C. Doble.

Porter Campus

The Porter Campus is in Porter Square. It is home to the majority of the university's classroom space, the College of Art and Design, the Lunder Arts Center, the Graduate School of Education, as well as Student Administrative and Financial Services, the university bookstore, the Moriarty Library and the majority of the university's art galleries.

Student life

Residential life
Residential Life at the university is for undergraduates. The program emphasizes community building, personal growth, and offers many leadership opportunities. Including: Community Advisors (Resident Assistants), Community Council, Residence Life Advisory Board, and Summer Resident Assistants. The university offers a variety of housing options from traditional style dormitories to Victorian homes and suite-style apartments.

Athletics
Lesley University participates in the NCAA Division III's New England Collegiate Conference. Its athletic teams' nickname is the Lynx.

Athletic Teams

 Baseball
 Men's Basketball
 Women's Basketball
 Men's Cross Country
 Women's Cross Country
 Men's Soccer
 Women's Soccer
 Softball
 Men's Tennis
 Women's Tennis
 Men's Track
 Women's Track
 Men's Volleyball
 Women's Volleyball

Notable alumni

Joan Bennett Kennedy (née Bennett, born September 2, 1936) is an American socialite, musician, author, and former model. She was the first wife of U.S. Senator Ted Kennedy.
Joseph C. Carter is a retired Brigadier General who was The Adjutant General of the Massachusetts National Guard from 2007 - 2012. He is the former chief of the Massachusetts Bay Transportation Authority Police.
Jessica Sonneborn is an American actress, writer, director and stunt double, who is known for starring roles in Bloody Bloody Bible Camp and Dorothy and the Witches of Oz.
Katharine Dukakis is an American author. She is the wife of former Massachusetts governor Michael Dukakis.
Jasmine Warga is an American children's and young adult book author. Her free verse book Other Words for Home received a Newbery Honor in 2020.
Jacob Bannon is an American musician who is the vocalist, lyricist and graphic artist for the metalcore band Converge. He is the co-founder and owner of the record label Deathwish Inc. and the author of many visual works for independent punk rock and heavy metal musicians.
Rhoda Perry was a Democratic member of the Rhode Island Senate, representing the 3rd District. Perry was the chairwoman of Senate Committee on Health & Human Services and a member, Senate Committee on Judiciary.
Shealah Craighead is an American government photographer who served as the Chief Official White House Photographer for President Donald Trump. She is the second female chief photographer in White House history. Craighead previously served as official photographer to former First Lady Laura Bush.
Erik Weihenmayer is an American educator, athlete, adventurer, author, activist and motivational speaker. He was the first blind person to reach the summit of Mount Everest, on May 25, 2001.
Caroll Spinney was an American puppeteer, cartoonist, author, artist and speaker, most famous for playing Big Bird and Oscar the Grouch on Sesame Street from its inception in 1969 until 2018.
Candice Iloh is a Nigerian American poet, educator, and writer. Their debut novel, Every Body Looking, was a finalist for the National Book Award for Young People's Literature in 2020 and Michael L. Printz Award honor book in 2021.

References

External links

 Official website

 
1909 establishments in Massachusetts
Educational institutions established in 1909
Universities and colleges in Cambridge, Massachusetts
Private universities and colleges in Massachusetts